The Angelo State Rams baseball team represents Angelo State University in NCAA Division II college baseball. The team was resurrected in 2005 after a long hiatus because of continued student requests and support. The team belongs to the Lone Star Conference and plays home games at Foster Field, an on-campus field.  The field was constructed in 2000 and features 4,200 seats, a Triple-A lighting system and an inning-by-inning scoreboard with a video display. It features major league style dugouts and locker rooms and a complete training facility, making it one of the most modern facilities in NCAA Division II college baseball.  In 2015 2.1 million dollars of renovations were made to the facility, including adding an AstroTurf playing field, all new blue chair back seats, and padding the outfield wall.  In addition the ASU Sports Complex consists of two NCAA regulation fields used for practice, along with indoor practice facilities. The Rams only coach has been Kevin Brooks.   The only coach in ASU baseball history, he has a 219-134 Lone Star Conference record and a 14-11 record in five trips to the NCAA postseason. The Rams are the only current Lone Star Conference team to ever make the College World Series (Central Oklahoma in 1997, SE Oklahoma State in 2000, and Abilene Christian in 2003 are the others) and Brooks has taken them there five times in only 17 seasons. The Rams have also won the Lone Star Conference tournament championship two times, including the 2015 LSC Championship when the team swept their way to the title and in 2012. His list of accomplishments includes the LSC South Division title in 2006, the Lone Star Conference and NCAA Division II South Central Regional titles in 2007,2015, and 2016, a semifinal appearance in the 2009 South Central Regional tournament and the LSC regular season and tournament championships in 2012. He has coached over 100 All-Lone Star Conference selections, 40 All-Region picks and 23 All-American selections. Brooks has also prepared his players for the next level as 22 former Rams have played or are currently playing professional baseball, including 7 in the last 2 years.

In 2016, the Rams once again won the regular season Lone Star Conference title and swept their way to the D2 World Series winning 4 straight games at the South Central Regional to advance in back to back years, a feat never accomplished before in the South Central region.  In 2015, Brooks and the Rams advanced to the College World Series for the second time in program history this past season after sweeping their way through the LSC Championship and then winning the NCAA DII South Central Championship by taking four straight elimination games for their second regional title. The Rams earned a 5-0 win over Wilmington in the College World Series, but were eliminated with a pair of losses to Henderson State. The 2015 team set multiple records, including running off a 15-game winning streak at the beginning of the season and the pitching staff had a program-low 3.11 ERA. Paxton DeLaGarza, Steve Naemark, Blake Bass and J.C. Snyder were each named All-Americans, while David Goggin earned the Lone Star Conference Academic Player of the Year and was then named the NCAA DII Baseball ELITE 89 winner for having the best GPA at the National Finals. ASU had 13 players earn LSC postseason honors, highlighted by Naemark being named the LSC Pitcher of the Year and DeLaGarza the LSC Player of the Year. Both players were in their first year in the program. Finishing the season with a 42-18 record, ASU and Brooks have now compiled five seasons of 40 or more wins.

Brooks led the Rams to the NCAA DII South Central tournament for the fourth time in 2013 with an at-large bid as the region's fourth seed. ASU went 1-2 at the tournament, including a 9-1 win over Texas A&M-Kingsville before a 7-6 loss in 13 innings ended its season. The 2013 Rams included 10 players who were honored with LSC postseason awards and Lee Neumann who earned the ABCA/Rawlings South Central Player of the Year and was named an All-American for the second straight season. Andrew LaCombe, who was the LSC's first-team catcher, earned first-team Capital One Academic All-American honors. The Rams went 37-21 to win 30 or more games for the eighth time in program history.

Under Brooks’ guidance, the 2012 Rams went 20-8 in LSC play and celebrated the LSC tournament title on their home field. ASU hit .321 as a team in 2012 with 120 doubles, 36 home runs, 23 triples and stole 105 bases. The pitching staff had an earned run average of 3.87 in 457.2 innings of work and limited opponents to a .270 batting average. The Rams outscored their opponents 409-241 in the course of the 57-game season. ASU owned its home field, going 24-4 at Foster Field.

The 2007 Rams finished with a 51-20 (.718) mark and set five individual and seven team Lone Star Conference records along the way. The program itself set a new record by reaching the Division-II College World Series in only its third season of existence, the fastest such trip in NCAA history. Brooks’ Rams have only finished lower than second in the Lone Star Conference postseason tournament once since the ASU program was revived in 2005 and he earned the Sportsman of the Year award from the San Angelo Standard-Times for his outstanding leadership and success on the field in 2007.

Prior to his arrival at Angelo State, Brooks was an assistant coach at Hardin-Simmons University from 2000–03 and an assistant coach at the University of Texas-San Antonio in 2000. Preceding that, he was a volunteer assistant coach at Texas A&M in 1999 helping the Aggies to the Big XII title in their run to the NCAA Division I College World Series. He served as an assistant coach at the University of Incarnate Word from 1994-1998 and lent his knowledge to the Jayhawk League where he worked as a summer coach in 1993 and for the Hays (Kan.) Larks in 1995.

In Brooks’ 20 years of coaching experience, he coached Major League Baseball National League All-Star Lance Berkman when he played summer ball for the Hays Larks. With Brooks’ guidance, the Hays Larks finished second in the 1995 National Baseball Congress (NBC) World Series behind the 1996 USA Olympic Baseball Team.

A graduate of Baylor University, Brooks earned his bachelor's degree in secondary education and played baseball for the Bears baseball team from 1988-1991. He also holds a master's degree in physical education from Incarnate Word.

Rams in Major League Baseball
 Jim Morris, MLB player for the Tampa Bay Devil Rays; inspiration for the film The Rookie

References

External links